Govind Singh Negi was an Indian politician and leader of Communist Party of India (CPI). He was elected as a member of Uttar Pradesh Legislative Assembly from Tehri in 1969, 1974 and 1977.

The power of communists was once in Lal Ghati...

Pratapnagar, Tehri was once called Lal Ghati

In 1969, 1974, 1977, Shri Govind Singh Negi was a Communist Party MLA from here.

  The Congress party has been leaving Tehri seat for the communist Shri Govind Singh Negi.  He also continued to win.  They fought here, most of the people associated with the Communist Party used to see red flags everywhere, that's why it was called Lal Ghati.

Shri Govind Singh Negi was a learned politician and he was also a great lawyer. He later practiced as a lawyer of repute in Dehradun. Due to the land of conflicts, this Bhagirathi valley came to be known as Puri Lal Ghati.  The Communists had one thing for sure that along with power, they used to read and write a lot, which is also very important for the representatives of the people.

The name of the village of Shri Govind Singh Negi is Dharkot Patti Dharmandal Tehsil Pratapnagar.

References

Communist Party of India politicians from Uttarakhand
Uttar Pradesh MLAs 1969–1974
Uttar Pradesh MLAs 1974–1977
Uttar Pradesh MLAs 1977–1980
People from Tehri Garhwal district
Year of birth missing